Chloritoid is a silicate mineral of metamorphic origin. It is an iron magnesium manganese alumino-silicate hydroxide with formula . It occurs as greenish grey to black platy micaceous crystals and foliated masses. Its Mohs hardness is 6.5, unusually high for a platy mineral, and it has a specific gravity of 3.52 to 3.57. It typically occurs in phyllites, schists and marbles.

Both monoclinic and triclinic polytypes exist and both are pseudohexagonal.

It was first described in 1837 from localities in the Ural Mountains region of Russia. It was named for its similarity to the chlorite group of minerals.

References

Iron(II) minerals
Magnesium minerals
Manganese(II) minerals
Aluminium minerals
Nesosilicates
Monoclinic minerals
Triclinic minerals
Minerals in space group 2
Minerals in space group 15